Macy may refer to:


People and fictional characters
Macy (given name), a list of people and fictional characters
Macy (surname), a list of people

Places

Antarctica
 Macy Glacier, West Antarctica

United States
 Macy, Indiana, a town
 Macy, Maine, a village
 Macy, Nebraska, a census-designated place

See also
 Macy's, American department store chain
 Macy conferences, meetings of scholars to set the foundations for a general science of the workings of the human mind
 Macyville, Kansas, an unincorporated community
 Macey (disambiguation)